Many political parties and other political movements have adopted a song or anthem to represent their beliefs and principles. This party song or party anthem is often sung or performed at party conferences.

Algeria
National Liberation Front – Kassaman

Angola
People's Movement for the Liberation of Angola – Hino do MPLA

Argentina
Justicialist Party – Peronist March
Radical Civic Union – Marcha Radical

Austria
Social Democratic Party of Austria – Lied der Arbeit

Bangladesh
Bangladesh Awami League – Pralayollas

Brazil
Worker's Party – O Hino do Partido Trabalhadores

Bulgaria
Bulgarian Communist Party – The Internationale

Cambodia
Cambodian People's Party - Anthem of the Cambodian People's Party
National United Front for an Independent, Neutral, Peaceful and Cooperative Cambodia (FUNCINPEC) - Victory! FUNCINPEC Party

Canada
Co-operative Commonwealth Federation – CCF Song

Chile
National Renewal – Himno Renovación Nacional
Unidad Popular - "Venceremos"
Mi General, Augusto Pinochet

China
Communist Party of China – The Internationale
Kuomintang – Three Principles of the People

Colombia
Colombian Conservative Party – Himno Partido Conservador Colombiano
Colombian Liberal Party – Himno Oficial Partido Liberal Colombiano

Côte d'Ivoire
Rally of the Republicans – Hymne du RDR (Le Républicain)

Croatia
Croatian Peasant Party – Slavni sine hrvatskoga roda

Denmark
Social Democrats – Når jeg ser et rødt flag smælde

Dominican Republic
Dominican Liberation Party – Himno del Partido de la Liberacion Dominicana
Dominican Revolutionary Party – Himno del Partido Revolucionario Dominicano
Modern Revolutionary Party – Himno del Partido Revolucionario Moderno
Social Christian Reformist Party – Himno del Partido Reformista Social Cristiano

East Germany
Socialist Unity Party of Germany – Song of the Party

France
Socialist Party - Changer la vie

Gabon
Gabonese Democratic Party – Hymne du Parti Démocratique Gabonais

Georgia
Conservative Party of Georgia – Chemo k’argo kveq’ana

Ghana
National Democratic Congress – Arise, Arise for Ghana
New Patriotic Party - We are the New Patriotic Party

Greece
Golden Dawn Party – Ymnos Chrysís Avgís
New Democracy – Néa Dimokratía

Guinea-Bissau
African Party for the Independence of Guinea and Cape Verde – Esta É a Nossa Pátria Bem Amada

Honduras
Christian Democratic Party of Honduras – Himno Partido Democracia Cristiana de Honduras
Liberal Party of Honduras – Himno del Partido Liberal de Hondura
National Party of Honduras – Himno Partido Nacional de Honduras

Indonesia
Democratic Party – Hymne Partai Demokrat
Indonesian Democratic Party of Struggle – Hymne PDI Perjuangan
Indonesian Solidarity Party – Hymne PSI
National Awakening Party – Mars PKB
National Mandate Party – Mars PAN
Perindo Party – Hymne Perindo
People's Conscience Party – Mars Hanura
United Development Party – Mars PPP

Ireland
Fianna Fáil – Soldiers of the Legion of the Rearguard
Labour Party – The Red Flag

Israel
Likud – The Likud Jingle

Italy
Christian Democracy – O bianco fiore
Forza Italia – Inno di Forza Italia
Italian Communist Party – Bandiera rossa
National Fascist Party – Giovinezza

Japan
Imperial Rule Assistance Association – Anthem of the Taisei Yokusankai
Liberal Democratic Party – We

Kazakhstan
Nur Otan – Elim Menin

Malaysia
Democratic Action Party – Berjuang Untuk Rakyat Malaysia!
Liberal Democratic Party – Liberal Democratic Party Song
Malaysian Chinese Association – Ma Hua Dang Ge
Malaysian Islamic Party – Berjihadlah
Malaysian People's Party – Demi Rakyat
Malaysian People's Movement Party – Satu Hati
Malaysian United Indigenous Party – Perjuangan Kita
National Trust Party – Lagu Parti Amanah
People's Justice Party – Arus Perjuangan Bangsa
Sarawak United Peoples' Party – SUPP Party Song
United Bumiputera Heritage Party – March PBB
United Malays National Organisation – Bersatu Bersetia Berkhidmat

Mali
Union for the Republic and Democracy – l’Union

Malta
Labour Party – L-Innu tal-Partit Laburista
Nationalist Party – Sbejħa Patrija

Mongolia
Democratic Party of Mongolia – Khonkhny duu

Mozambique
FRELIMO – Hino da FRELIMO

Myanmar
Pa-O National Organisation – Pa-O National Song

Nazi Germany
NSDAP – The Horst Wessel Song

Nicaragua
Sandinista National Liberation Front – Himno a la Unidad SandinistaNorth Korea
 Workers' Party of Korea – Long Live the Workers' Party of KoreaPakistan
Pakistan Tehreek-e-Insaf – Naya PakistanParaguay
Colorado Party – Himno del Partido ColoradoPeru
Popular Action – Marcha del Partido APPhilippines
Kilusang Bagong Lipunan – Bagong PagsilangPartido Demokratiko Pilipino-Lakas ng Bayan – Pambansang Martsa ng PDP–LabanCommunist Party of the Philippines – Pandaigdigang Awit ng mga ManggagawaPoland
Law and Justice – Hymn Prawa i SprawiedliwościPolish People's Party – RotaSpring – Piosenka WiosnyPortugal
Portuguese Communist Party – Avante CamaradaSocial Democratic Party – Paz, Pão, Povo e LiberdadeSocialist Party – Socialismo em LiberdadePuerto Rico
Popular Democratic Party – Jalda ArribaRomania
National Liberal Party – Verde-nrouratRussia
A Just Russia — For Truth – Gimn partii Spravedlivaya RossiyaCommunists of Russia – Gimn Partii BolshevikovCommunist Party of the Russian Federation – The InternationaleLiberal Democratic Party of Russia – Velikaya RossiyaUnited Russia – Gimn partii Edinaya RossiyaRussian Liberation Army - My Idyom Shirokimi PolyamiSerbia
Serbian Progressive Party – Tamo dalekoSerbian Radical Party – Spremte se spremte četniciSocialist Party of Serbia – Himna SPSSlovenia
Slovenian Democratic Party – Slovenska PomladSouth Africa
African National Congress – Nkosi Sikelel' iAfrikaSoviet Union
Communist Party of the Soviet Union – The Internationale, Bolshevik Party AnthemSpain
Traditionalist Communion – Marcha de OriamendiFalange –  Cara al SolSyria
Arab Socialist Ba'ath Party – Syria Region – Arab Socialist Ba'ath Party AnthemTurkey
Motherland Party – Hadi BakalimRepublican People's Party – CHP Özgürlük MarşıUnited Kingdom
British National Party – Jerusalem in England, Londonderry Air in Northern Ireland, Scotland the Brave in Scotland and Land of My Fathers in Wales
Conservative Party – Land of Hope and GloryLabour Party – The Red Flag and JerusalemLiberal Party – The LandLiberal Democrats – The LandScottish Green Party - "Freedom Come-All-Ye"
Scottish National Party – Scots Wha HaeSocialist Workers Party – The InternationaleSocialist Party (England and Wales) – The InternationaleTrades Union Congress – Auld Lang SyneBritish Union of Fascists - Comrades the Voices, Britain Awake United States 

 Democratic Party - Happy Days are Here AgainUruguay
National Party – Marcha Tres ÁrbolesVenezuela
United Socialist Party of Venezuela – La Hora del Pueblo''

References

 
Political Party Songs